La renzoni is a 1916 Dutch silent drama film directed by Maurits Binger.

Cast
 Annie Bos - Alda
 Willem van der Veer - Alda's man / Alda's husband
 Paula de Waart - Mevr. van Ingen / Mrs. van Ingen
 Jan van Dommelen - Henri de Jager
 Nico De Jong - Prins / Prince
 Lola Cornero
 Renee Spiljar - Eén van Alda's kinderen / one of Alda's children (as Renée Spilar)
 Ernst Winar
 Jack Hamel

External links 
 

1916 films
Dutch silent feature films
Dutch black-and-white films
1916 drama films
Films directed by Maurits Binger
Dutch drama films
Silent drama films